Elizaveta Posadskikh (born 10 March 1994) is a Russian BMX freestyle cyclist.

Posadskikh competed at the 2020 Olympic Games where she placed 9th in the women's BMX freestyle event.

References

1994 births
Living people
Russian female cyclists
BMX riders
Cyclists at the 2020 Summer Olympics
Olympic cyclists of Russia
21st-century Russian women